Jackson Township is an inactive township in Randolph County, in the U.S. state of Missouri.

Jackson Township has the name of Hancock Jackson, a pioneer citizen, and afterward 13th Governor of Missouri.

References

Townships in Missouri
Townships in Randolph County, Missouri